Violet Mar (died 1577) was a Scottish woman accused of plotting the death of Regent Morton by witchcraft.

Violet lived at Kildeis or Keldeis in Muthill or Methven in Perthshire. She was accused of using "sorcery, witchcraft, incantations, and the invocation of spirits" apparently to bring down the ruler of Scotland, Regent Morton. There is hardly anything known of her life and motivations.

A local laird Robert Murray of Abercairny was involved in her arrest and trial. He asked his sister-in-law, Annabell Murray, Countess of Mar for advice. She was at time the head of the household of the king, James VI, at Stirling Castle.

In September 1577 Annabell Murray, Countess of Mar wrote to Robert Murray, telling not to come to Stirling Castle, because Regent Morton was coming. The Laird of Abercairny wanted to bring Violet Mar to Stirling, and Annabell Murray advised him to get written statements from her accusers. This was the second letter on the subject from the Countess of Mar, and she was clearly active in planning the trial of Violet Mar. It has been suggested that the Countess helped form the attitudes of James VI of Scotland towards women accused of witchcraft.

On 10 October 1577 a royal messenger, Robert Binning, was sent from Edinburgh to summon Margaret Murray, Lady Clackmannan (another sister of Catherine Murray, Lady Abercairney and the Countess of Mar), the Laird of Abercairny and his wife Catherine Murray, and others, to come before the Privy Council on 18 October. Binning also brought the summons for the assize of Violet Mar, to be held on 24 October.

Violet Mar was brought to trial and convicted on 24 October 1577.

Apology from Scottish government
In March 2022 Nicola Sturgeon, the first minister of Scotland, apologized for the persecution of alleged witches during the 16th, 17th, and 18th centuries. The Scottish government had not apologized previously.

References

1577 deaths
16th-century Scottish women
Witch trials in Scotland
People executed for witchcraft
16th-century executions by Scotland